The 2002 Hertsmere Borough Council election took place on 2 May 2002 to elect members of Hertsmere Borough Council in Hertfordshire, England. One third of the council was up for election and the Conservative Party stayed in overall control of the council.

After the election, the composition of the council was:
Conservative 24
Labour 9
Liberal Democrat 5
Independent 1

Background
Before the election the Conservatives controlled the council with 22 seats, compared to 10 for Labour, 5 Liberal Democrats and 2 independents. Since the 2000 election 2 Labour councillors, husband and wife Martin and Jean Heywood, had left the party and became independents.

13 of the 15 wards had seats contested in 2002, with only Aldenham East and Aldenham West having no election. The Conservative and Labour parties both had 5 seats up for election, while the Liberal Democrats defended 4 and the independents had 1 seat being contested.

Election result
The Conservatives increased their majority after gaining 2 seats from Labour to have 24 councillors, compared to 9 for Labour, 5 Liberal Democrats and 1 independent. The Conservatives gained Borehamwood Hillside by 74 votes, with the winning candidate, Sandra Parnell, becoming the first Conservative councillor for Borehamwood since 1976. The other Conservative gain came in Shenley, where Rosemary Gilligan took the seat by 154 votes, after the Conservatives had gained the other seat in the ward at the last election in 2000.

Despite losing 2 seats Labour did gain a seat in Borehamwood Cowley Hill by 193 votes defeating independent Jean Heywood. Heywood had left Labour to sit as an independent in 2001 and both she and the Labour candidate Joe Goldberg accused the other of dirty tricks during the campaign. Overall turnout at the election was 32.6%, an increase from 30.6% in 2000.

Following the election the remaining independent councillor, Martin Heywood, joined the Conservatives, taking the Conservatives to a then record 25 seats on the council.

Ward results

References

External links
Conservative manifesto
Labour manifesto
Liberal Democrat manifesto
Independent manifesto (Cowley Hill)
Independent manifesto (Kenilworth)
Socialist Labour manifesto

2002 English local elections
2002
2000s in Hertfordshire